Tweesluizen is a hamlet in the Dutch province of Gelderland. It is a part of the municipality of Buren, and lies about 4 km west of Tiel.

Tweesluizen is not a statistical entity, and the postal authorities have placed it under Kapel-Avezaath.  It was first mentioned in 1899 as Twee Sluizen, and means two sluices. It consists of about 20 houses.

References

Populated places in Gelderland
Buren